Zăpodia River may refer to:
 Zăpodia, a tributary of the Bâlta in Gorj County, Romania
 Zăpodia River (Neagra Șarului), in Suceava County, Romania